The works of Veronica Whall provides a list of works carried out by Veronica Whall (1887–1967).

Whall predominantly created stained glass works for churches and cathedrals. She started out assisting her father, Christopher Whall, in stained glass commissions, such as that at All Saints in Valescure, France, in 1918-19 and the St Christopher window in Sproughton, Suffolk, in 1924.

Aside from being a stained glass artist and designer, Whall also worked in watercolour.  One such work was "The elf hour" which was exhibited at The New Gallery's Summer Exhibition of 1907. In 1912 Whall wrote and illustrated "The Story of Peterkin in the Wood". Whall also illustrated a book that was a selection of folk-songs, under the title "Ships, Sea-Songs and Shanties" written by a relative, Captain William Boultbee Whall. Captain Whall was a mariner and writer on nautical subjects. The selection was published in 1910 by James Brown & Son in Glasgow.

Stained glass works
For more on this important stained glass artist and the history of the art in this period, see Peter Cormack, Arts & Crafts Stained Glass (London & New Haven: Yale University Press, 2015).

The following is a list of some of Whall's stained glass work.  She also designed windows for St Wilfred's Church in Brighton, and performed restoration work following the war for the Roman Catholic Church of St Mary in Clapham.

Gallery

References 

Christopher Whall
Lists of stained glass works